Sacramento is the capital of the U.S. state of California.

Sacramento may also refer to:

Places

Brazil 
Sacramento, Minas Gerais

Costa Rica
Sacramento, Costa Rica

Mexico 
Sacramento, Coahuila
Sacramento River (Mexico)

Portugal
Sacramento (Lisbon), a Portuguese parish

United States 
Sacramento, California
Sacramento, Kentucky
Sacramento, Nebraska
Sacramento, New Mexico
Sacramento, Pennsylvania
Sacramento, Wisconsin
Sacramento River, California
Sacramento Valley, California

Uruguay 
Colonia del Sacramento

Other
Sacramento (magazine), a lifestyle magazine based in Sacramento, California
"Sacramento" (song), by Deep Dish, 2005
"Sacramento" (A Wonderful Town), a song by Middle of the Road, 1971
Dylan Sacramento (born 1995), Canadian soccer player
USS Sacramento, three ships of the United States Navy
 "Sacramento", a song by Cherry Ghost from their 2014 album Herd Runners
SS Asbury Park, vessel formerly known as the SS City of Sacramento

See also

Sacramento Kings, a professional basketball team based in Sacramento, California
Sacramento City (disambiguation)